CID is an Indian police procedural television series created by B. P. Singh for Sony Entertainment Television India. The series stars Shivaji Satam as ACP Pradyuman, Aditya Srivastava as Sr. Inspector Abhijeet, Dayanand Shetty as Sr. Inspector Daya, Dinesh Phadnis as Inspector Fredricks aka Freddy and Narendra Gupta  as Forensic expert Dr. Salunkhe respectively.

The location of CID is set in Mumbai. The series aired for 20 years on Sony TV and is the longest-running television series in India. The series premiered on 21 January 1998 and The last episode aired on 27 October 2018. The series aired its 500th episode on 18 January 2008, 1,000th episode on 13 September 2013 and 1,500th episode on 25 February 2018.

Cast

Main 
 Shivaji Satam as ACP Pradyuman (1998–2018). Initially referred as Sr. Inspector Pradyuman in the first few episodes after which he got a promotion to ACP in episode "The Case of the Thief Within – I" and had been referred to ACP Pradyuman since.
 Dinesh Phadnis as Inspector Fredricks aka Freddy (1998–2018). He first appeared in episode "Kissa Raat Ke Shikhar Ka – I", but his role as Sub-Inspector started in episode "The Case of the Third Man – I" where he was initially referred as Sub Inspector Prince/Michael but referred as Fredricks from episode "The Case of the Last Five Minutes – I".
 Ashutosh Gowariker as Sr. Inspector Virendra (1998–1999). He first appeared in episode "The Case of the Thief Within – I". His last episode in the show was episode "The Case of Missing Fugitive – II". He was transferred.
 Dayanand Shetty as Sr. Inspector Daya (1998–2018). He first appeared in episode "The Case of the Anonymous Threats – I" as Sub Inspector Daya. He is referred to as Senior Inspector Daya in later episodes.
 Narendra Gupta as Dr. R. P. Salunkhe (1998–2003, 2005, 2007–2018). He made his debut in the episode "The Case of the Incomplete Letter", where he was initially referred to as Dr. Verma but referred to as Dr. Salunkhe from episode "The Case of the Burnt Letter – I".
 Aditya Srivastava as Sr. Inspector Abhijeet (1998, 1999–2018). He first appeared as character named 'Paresh', who stole ACP's gun in episode  "The Case of the Stolen Gun". His role as Inspector Abhijeet started in the episode "The Case of the Stolen Dynamite – I".

Recurring 

 Afshan Khan as Sub-Inspector Mridula (1998). She first appeared in episode "Case of the Thief Within – I".
 Ashwini Kalsekar as Sub-Inspector Asha (1998–2004). She first appeared in the episode "The Case of Second Statement – I". Her last episode was episode "Case of the Dazed Man – II".
 Dhananjay Mandrekar as Sub-Inspector Sudhakar (1998–2005). He appeared as Sub Inspector Bhonsale in starting episodes but after episode 35 he was referred as Sub Inspector Sudhakar. He was last seen in episode "The Case of the Stolen Ring – I".
 Vaquar Shaikh as Inspector Jeet (1998). He appeared in episode "The Case of the Contract Killer"
 Sanjay Shemkalyanee as Sub-Inspector Desai (1998)
 Manoj Verma as Sub-Inspector Shinde (1998)
 Dilip Kulkarni as DCP Dipankar Deshmukh (1998–2002). He was first seen in episode 7 and was last seen on episode The case of Invisible Bullet- II
 Shweta Kanoje as Neha. (1998)
 Sanjeev Seth as Sub-Inspector Sanjeev (1998). He first appeared in episode "The Case of the Anonymous Threats – I". Additionally, he also appeared as a case victim named Sanjeev in episode "The Case of The Red Cloth – I".
 Tushar Dalvi as Inspector Jayant (1999). He first appeared in episode "The Case of Cross Connection – I". He was last seen in episode "The Case Of Stolen Dynamite – ll".
Mouli Ganguly as Dr. Amrita (2002). She appeared as junior Forensic Doctor in episode "The Case Of the Invisible Bullet – I" when Dr. Salunkhe was accused by ACP for hiding the bullet used in the murder.
 Shweta Kawatra as Dr. Niyati Pradhan (2003, 2005–2007). Her first episode was episode "The Case of Nailing the Suspect – I". She was last seen in episode "The Case of Perfect Murder".
 Mandeep Bhandar as Dr. Vrinda Wagle (2003–2004). Her first episode was episode "The Case of the Red Rain – l". Her last episode was "The Case of the Dazed Man – II".
 Mona Ambegaonkar as Dr. Anjalika Deshmukh (2004–2005) Her first episode was episode "Case of the Invisible Bomb – I". She was last seen in episode "Murder By Marriage – I".
 Rahil Azam as Nakul Pradyuman (2004–2005, 2015) ACP Pradyuman's criminal son first seen in episode "Murders at Sunrise – II" and killed by Pradyuman in episode "Trail in London – III".
 Manav Gohil as Inspector Daksh (2004–2005) His first episode as a cop was "Trust Me – Trust Me Not – I". His last episode was "Trail in London – II". He was killed by Nakul.
 Smita Bansal as Inspector Aditi (2004–2005) Her first episode was "The Case of the Haunted Building – I". Her last episode was "Mad Bomber – II". She died in the episode.
 Surendra Pal as DCP (2005). His first episode was "The Case of the Killer Lake – l". He was last seen in episode "Face Off – lll".
 Kavita Kaushik as Sub-Inspector Anushka (2005–2006). She appeared in episodes "Trail in London" (all parts) as a Central Intelligence Sub-Inspector who secretly helps ACP Pradyuman. She enters CID in episode "Poison In The Nail – l". Her last episode was "Secret of the Code No. 571E1115".
 Sai Deodhar as Sub-Inspector Priyanka (2005) Her first episode was "Case of the Dead Waiter – I". Her last episode was "Trail in London – lll"
 Rajeev Khandelwal as ACP Prithviraj (2005) He appeared as an ACP in episodes: "Face Off – lll & lV" and "Trail in London" (all parts) when ACP Pradyuman was in London for investigation. He was also in episode "The Case of the Missing Bride" as himself.
 B. P. Singh His first appearance as DIG Shamsher Singh in the episode "Face Off-lll". After a long time he appears as DCP Shamsher Singh Chitrole (2005–2016) The senior of CID team and also an egoistic man who is also quite funny at times. He was a friend of ACP Pradyuman in college.
 Vivek V. Mashru as Sub-Inspector Vivek (2006–2012). His first episode was "The Case of the Killer Eyes". He was last seen in episode "Rahasyamay Bullet – III".
 Amar Upadhyay as Inspector Rishi (2006). He appeared as an inspector in episode "Murder in the Safety Vault". He joined the CID in that episode when he came to Mumbai for spend holidays. He was also seen as a supporting character named Harry in episode "Return of the Clown".
 Priya Wal as Dr. Nyla Rajadhyaksha (2006–2007). Her first episode was "The Case of the Killer Statues". Her last episode was "The Case of the Dangerous Lady".
 Alka Verma as Sub-Inspector Muskaan (2006–2007). Her first episode was episode "Red Rose Killer". "The Case of Inspector Daya's Abduction" was her last episode. She was transferred.
 Shraddha Musale as Dr. Tarika (2007–2018). Her debut episode was "The Don's Final Revenge".
 Megha Gupta as Sub-Inspector Devyana (2007–2008) Her first episode was "The Don's Final Revenge" and her last episode was episode "Mystery Of A Train Passenger". She returned for one episode "Bhoot Bangala".
 Parinita Seth as Sub-Inspector Kaveri (2008). She first appeared as Shreya in episode "The Great Diamond Robbery" and as Rohini in episode "The Cures of the Rose Queen", but as a cop her first appearance was in Episode "Khoon Bhari Holi", recruited by ACP Pradyuman through interview. In Episode 524 she was revealed to have gone for Special Training in Delhi. But she made a comeback in episode "Triangular Bullet's Mystery". Her last episode was "Khooni Goli Ka Rahasya".
 Jimmy Kunal Nanda as Sub-Inspector Lavanya (2008–2009) She was first seen spying on the CID team in episode "Khoon Bhari Holi". She was revealed as the new CID officer in episode "Katil Kaun Dohri Uljhan". She was last seen in episode "Students Mass Murderer".
 Vaishnavi Dhanraj as Sub-Inspector Tasha Kumar (2009–2010). She first appeared as an episodic character named Nathalia in episode "Qaatil Dank". Her first episode as a CID cop was episode "Anjaan Laash". Her last episode was Episode "Khatre Mein Tasha" in which she dies.
 Hrishikesh Pandey as Inspector Sachin (2010–2016). He first appeared in episode "Khooni Deewar" as an undercover CID cop under the alias Siddharth, but in middle of episode CID team finds out that he is an undercover. Later he is introduced by ACP as Inspector Sachin in episode "Maut ka Aashirwad". He was last seen in episode "Bank Robbery". Also in CID Special Bureau, he played the role of Inspector Abhimanyu.
 Jasveer Kaur as Sub-Inspector Kajal (2010–2012). She was first seen as a contract killer in episode "The Case of the Mysterious Gift" and a drug seller in episode "The Case of the Talking Parrot". Her first episode as a cop was episode "Maut Ka Aashirwad". Her last episode was "Khoon Ka Deewana".
 Manini Mishra as Dr. Sonali Barwe (2010–2011) She was first seen as an actress Kushi in episode "The Secret of the Deadly Chest" and fashion designer Menka in episode "Zehrily Dress". Her first episode as a forensic expert was "Rahasyamayi Darwaza".
 Abhay Shukla as Inspector Nikhil (2010–2016). His first appearance as a reporter "Traitors in CID". Next seen as security guard Ishaan in episode "Once Upon A Time in Mumbaai" (641) and a shopkeeper in episode "Bhutiya Ladki Ka Raaz" (655). He also played a negative role in his own name Abhay in the episode "AKAKR part-9". His first episode as a CID cop was episode "Qatl Ka Raaz Mare Hue Qatl Ke Paas". He was last seen in episode 1348 "Raaz Machli Ka".
 Ansha Sayed as Sub-Inspector Purvi (2011–2018). She was first seen as episodic character named Chandha in episode "Case of the Double Identity" (439), Kushi in episode "Case of the Bomb Robbery" (454), Pallavi in episode "7 Days to Die" and Pamela in episode "The Gift". Her first episode as Sub-Inspector Purvi was episode "Kissa Paagal Ashiq Kaa".
 Janvi Chheda as Sub-Inspector Shreya (2012–2016, 2018). She made her debut in episode "Raaz Sar Aur Haath Ka" where she was introduced along with Sub-Inspector Vineet. She was last seen in episode "Maut Ka Hathoda". She returned as an Intelligence Bureau Inspector in episodes 1491 and 1492.
 Vikas Kumar as Sr. Inspector Rajat (2012–2013). He joined in Episode "Khooni Paani". He was last seen in episode "Ped Ka Rahasya".
 Ajay Nagrath as Sub-Inspector Pankaj (2012–2018). He made his debut in the episode "CID Par Grahan – III".
 Vineet Kumar Chaudhary as Sub-Inspector Vineet (2012–2013). His first episode was "Raaz Sar Aur Haath Ka" where he was introduced along with Sub-Inspector Shreya. His last seen in episode "Raaz Teen Laashon Ka".
 Neha Gadoria as Trainee Officer Roma (2012) Her first episode was episode "Khoon Khabri Ka". She died in Episode "Khatre Mein CID Officer – II" due to being kidnapped and overflow of blood.
 Saanand Verma as Lab Assistant (2012)
 Maninder Singh as Inspector Dushyant Hemraj (2014). His first episode was episode "Bus Hijack – l". His last episode was episode "Kulhaadi Ka Raaz".
 Gaurav Khanna as Inspector Kavin (2014). His first episode was episode "Bus Hijack – ll". His last episode was episode "Band Kamre Mein Laash".
 Tanya Abrol as Sub-Inspector Jaywanti Shinde (2014–2016) Her first episode was episode "Action Jackson". She was last seen in episode "Bank Robbery".
 Tarun Khanna as Inspector Suraj (2012–2013). He was first appeared as supporting character named Rohan in episode "Gawah Bana Shikaar" and Rajveer in episode "Case of the Hotel Murder Mystery". His first episode as cop was "CID Par Grahan – III". He was last seen in episode "Raaz Haddiyo Ki Crockery Ka".
 Deepak Shirke as ACP Digvijay (2012–2013). He was brought in CID by DCP Chitrole as the new ACP in place of Pradyuman in episodes: "CID Par Grahan – ll, lll, lV". It was later revealed that he committed a crime long ago.
 Jagjit Athwal as Sub-Inspector Vansh (2014–2016). His first episode was "Mumbai Ki Chawl Ka Rahasya – l".
 KK Goswami as Dhenchu (2013–2014, 2016–2018) He is an informer introduced by DCP Chitrole in episode "CID Ke Chhote Fans" of CID Chhote Heroes.
 Ankur Sharma Kabir as Sub-Inspector Karan (2014–2015). His first episode as a cop was "Mumbai Ki Chawl Ka Rahasya – l".
 Vikas Salgotra as Sub-Inspector Mayur (2014–2016). His first episode was "Mumbai Ki Chawl Ka Rahasya – l".
 Pooja Khatri as Sub-Inspector Ishita (2014–2016). Her first episode was "Mumbai Ki Chawl Ka Rahasya – l". She was last seen in "Karo Ya Maro – III".
 Amaani Satrala as Sub-Inspector Divya (2014–2015). Her first episode was "Mumbai Ki Chawl Ka Rahasya – l". She was last seen in  "Badle Ki Aag"
 Abid Shaikh as Sub-Inspector Vikram (2014). His first episode was "Mumbai Ki Chawl Ka Rahasya – l".
 Kuldeep Singh as Dr. Vaibhav (2014). He appeared as junior forensic doctor. His first episode was "Mumbaicha Dabbawala".
 Vivana Singh as Cyber Inspector Ritu (2017–2018)
 Yagya Bhasin as Arjun (2018) Nakul's son, ACP Pradyuman's grandson
 Manoj Ramola as Ashok (2018)
Shweta Salve as Supervisor Sheetal (2018). She appeared as a supervisor who monitors the CID team in episodes "Rahasyamai Gavah". She died in episode 1544 to save lives of many people against a mysterious weapon.

 Guest 

 Sahil Chadha as Ajay Sethia (1998)
Milind Gawali as Sailesh (1998), Alok (1999), Devdhar (1999), Anupam (2002), Kuber (2003), Shyaman (2004)
Madan Jain as Naveen Kumar (1999)
Pavan Malhotra as Jeevan (1999)
Rajesh Khera as Jagdish (1999), Mangal (2000), Dushyant (2000), Dr Alok (2001), Badshah (2001), Johnny (2002), Kedar (2002), Rajiv (2004), Film Director (2004), Dance Choreographer (2004), Jaan (2006), Vishwajeet (2006)
Akshay Anand as Bharat Saxena (1999), Rajeev (2004)
Mohan Gokhale as Suvarna (1998), Kavi (1999)
Achyut Potdar as Kundan Seth (1998)
Anant Jog as Adv. Jagtap, Shashank (1998), Chandresh (2006)
 Manav Kaul as Neeraj (2000), Vikrant's brother (2000), Kantora (2003), Suraj (2006).
Shrivallabh Vyas as CBI Officer Shamsher (2000), Baldev (2001), Dr. Sahil (2001), DIG Baldev Raj (2002), Retd. Judge Raja Rao (2005), Lalchand (2007), Mr.Trout (2007), Jeevan Das (2007)
Manoj Joshi as Ranjan (2000), Drug lord (2000), Mahesh (2002), Dr Kanu (2002)
Adi Irani as Deepak (2001), Radio Manager Raman (2006), Tejpal (2016)
Nawazuddin Siddiqui as Alex (2001) (episode 157–158)
Shahbaz Khan as Karan (2006), Don (2007)
Prem Chopra as Raj (2001)
Om Puri as Sunder alias ACP Jose Santos in episode "The Case of the Counterfeit Cop".(2001)
Sanjay Mishra as Rajesh (2001)
Kashmera Shah as Kinneri (2001)
Milind Gunaji as Johnny (2001)
Sarita Joshi as Advocate Suhasini (2001)
Sanjay Batra as Vinay (2001)
Mushtaq Khan as Bacchu (2001)
Madhukar Toradmal as Business man Gupta, victim's father
Dinesh Hingoo as Builder Chunnilal (2001)
Paintal as mute man (2006)
Gufi Paintal as Chander (2001)
Viju Khote as Judge (2002), Deaf man (2006)
Bhagyashree as Nupur (2001)
Shishir Sharma as Kumar, Arjun (1998), Shailesh (1998)
Arif Zakaria as Chandan (2002)
 Deepak Qazir as Taxi Driver (2000)
Kapil Dev as himself in episode "Howzzat?" (2003)
Sudhir as Dr Kailash / Jinjaar/ Mr. Eliott (2003)
Ananya Khare as Shilpa (2002), Sunita (2004)
Rajesh Khattar as Pramod (2000), Rajesh (2006)
Bhairavi Raichura as Reshma (2005)
Abhijeet Sawant as himself (2005)
Sadashiv Amrapurkar as Subbu (2005)
Baba Sehgal as himself (2006)
Mandira Bedi as Reshma (2001), Saagrika (2005)
Bharat Kapoor as Sudhakar (1998) and Intelligence Officer Raman Kapoor (2002)
Kunika as Rakhi (2001)
Rajiv Paul as Jeevan (2000)
Murli Sharma as Giri (2000),Govinda(2005), Contract killer(2006),Dr O (2007)
Deepshika Nagpal as Lavanya Daneka a Tarot Card Reader Ep: Maut Ka Saudagar, Vyoma, Sudeep's Wife, Ep430:The Invisible Eye Witness (2006)
Shilpa Shinde as Sheetal in "The Case of Mysterious Shadows" (2006)
Vishal Kotian as RJ Sunny (2006)
Melissa Pais as Alice in episode: Murder in FM 97.1 (2006)
Mihir Mishra as KeniRaj in "Body in the Suitcase". (2006)
Dalljeit Kaur as Reshma/Neha E in "Body in the Suitcase" (2006), Sreeja in "The Invisible Eye Witness". (2006)
Narayani Shastri as Sunanda, Abhijeet's Friend Parthav's Wofer in "he Mysterious Gift". (2006)
Salman Khan as himself (2009) and (2014)
R. Madhavan as himself (2009)
Sajid Khan as himself (2009)
Mahek Chahal as herself (2009)
Inder Kumar as himself (2009)
Sarfaraz Khan  as himself (2009)
Yami Gautam as Ananya (2010) (episode 642, "Girl in Coffin")
Lavanya Tripathi as Sakshi in the case 'Maut ka Ashirvad' (2010)
 Nikhil Guharoy as Vijay (2009), Aman (2009), Anuj (2010), Sid (2011),  Nitin (2011),  Kunal (2012), Rishi (2013), Dr. Harshit (2013), Arun (2013), Hardik (2014), Sarthak, Randhir, Sundar and Vikram. He also appeared in "Maut ka Ashirwad" (2010) and "Aakhri Chunauti" (2010) as Sub-Inspector Kajal's brother Rahul Kumar.
Mahesh Manjrekar as H.D. (Harpez Dongara) (2010) He acted as a dangerous criminal who kidnapped all the CID officers and forensic experts and left India. Later in episode 664 Abhijeet shot him and he died.
Emraan Hashmi as himself (2010), Director Abraham (2011) and Raghuram "Raghu" Rathore aka Mr. X (2015).Mr. X aka Emraan Hashmi helps ACP Pradyuman solve a case on TV show CID
Sonalika Prasad as Sheela in "Jhagdalu Aurat" (2015).
Prachi Desai as herself (2010).
Ronit Roy as K.D Pathak from Adaalat (2010, 2012, 2014)
Rani Mukerji as herself (2011)
Aamir Khan as Senior Inspector Surjan Singh Shekhawat (2012)
Kareena Kapoor Khan as herself (2012)
Akshay Kumar as Shiva (2012) and as Rowdy Rathore (2012).
Sonakshi Sinha as Paro (2012), herself (2013)
Imran Khan as himself (2013)
Akanksha Puri as Nandita Menon (2013)
Sunny Deol as Saranjeet Singh Talwar aka Singh Saab (2013) and Ajay Mehra (2016)
Chandan Madan as Tez/Sumeet/Samrat/Manav/Sameer (2014–2018)
Dilip Joshi as Jethalal Champaklal Gada from Taarak Mehta Ka Ooltah Chashmah (2014)
Disha Vakani as Daya Jethalal Gada from Taarak Mehta Ka Ooltah Chashmah (2014)
Jimmy Sheirgill as Vishnu Sharma (2014)
Anu Malik as himself (2014)
Jas Arora as Sunny / Pathan
Jackky Bhagnani as Abhimanyu Kaul (2014)
Govinda as Armaan (2014)
Saif Ali Khan as Yudi Jaitely (2014)
Shraddha Kapoor as herself (2014)
Sidharth Malhotra as himself (2014)
Sunny Leone as Ragini (2014)
Thakur Anoop Singh as Daya (2014) in episode: Daya v/s Daya
Varun Dhawan as himself (2015)
Shah Rukh Khan as himself (2015)
Sushant Singh Rajput as Byomkesh Bakshi (2015)
Anand Tiwari as Ajit Kumar Bandhopadhyay (2015)
Diganth as himself (2015)
Rahul Dev as Katori Damta. He played the negative role in Karo Ya Maro story arc. (2016)
 Gauri Tonk as Dolly Harpez Dongara, wife of Harpez Dongara taking revenge from Abhijeet for Harpez's death in the Karo Ya Maro story arc. (2016)
Abbas–Mustan as themselves (2017)
Kiara Advani as herself (2017)
Tigmanshu Dhulia as Barbosa, Leader of The Eye Gang (2018)

 CID: Special Bureau cast (2004–2006) 

 Anup Soni as ACP Ajatshatru
 Salil Ankola as Sr. Inspector Akshay
 Nimai Bali as Sr. Inspector Pratap
 Hrishikesh Pandey as Inspector Abhimanyu
 Sushmita Daan as Inspector Jasmine Prakash
 Manasi Varma as Inspector Tejali Krutia
 Sharad Kelkar as Inspector Jehan
 Mahi as Inspector Gargi
 Mugdha Godbole as Inspector Akanksha
 Amita Chandekar as Inspector Ashwini
 Sachin Sharma as Inspector Samar
 Kushal Punjabi as Inspector Kushal
 Ravindra Mankani as Dr. Bharadwaj
 Shweta Kawatra as Dr. Niyati Pradhan
 Dilip Joshi as Bob
 unknown as Ishika, A.C.P. Ajatshatru's adopted daughter
 Yash Tonk as Billa, Ishika's biological father
 Manav Kaul as Yashwant

 CID 111 – The Inheritance CID got into both the Limca Book of Records and the Guinness Book of World Records on 7 November 2004 for its record-breaking single shot episode of 111 minutes (1 hour and 51 minutes), entitled "The Inheritance" without a cut which writer – director – producer B. P. Singh feels "every Indian should be proud of because no one has achieved this before".

 Cast 
 Kay Kay Menon as Vinod Sagar
 Raj Zutshi as Johnson
 Avinash Wadhawan as Kishore
 Kruttika Desai as Ketki
 Mukesh Rawal as Vishwanath
 Kunal Tavri as Kapil
 Seema Pandey as Sharmila
 Swati Anand as Susheela
 Sharmilee Raj as Reena
 Swati Mitra as Loveleen
 Jaydutt Vyas as Bhargav
 Shahid Khan as Raghu
 Tirthesh Thakkar
 Mayur Bhavsar

 Other sub-series 
 CID – Special Bureau (2004–2006): A series about special branch of CID which deals with cases which were left unsolved for many years.
 CID – Chhote Heroes (2013): a spin-off series in which kids solve crimes with the help of CID.

 Episode list 

Run time of episodes 1 to 404 is around 20 minutes and episodes 405 to 1547 is approximately 43 minutes on an average.

 CID Chhote Heroes Episodes 

 CID: Special Bureau – Episodes 

 Production 
 Filming CID is primarily shot in Mumbai, Maharashtra, India. During the long course of the show, the series has been shot in various locations all over India. The series has also been shot in foreign countries. Some Foreign locations have included places like Uzbekistan, a major shoot in Paris, and Switzerland which included tourist attractions like Interlaken as well as cities such as Berne and Zurich. The major shoot in Paris-Switzerland was for the 2 hourly special episode "Aakhri Chunauti", and a part of the production team's 13th anniversary celebration plan.

 Cancellation 
The show was decided to end suddenly by the channel and on 27 October 2018, the last episode was aired. Rumours of the show getting cancelled was going rounds while the official statement by the channel stated  the show will go off air for three months to give the producers enough time to reboot it. Further it was reported that "CID is not wrapping up. But it is going on a short break and that's only for a creative reason. The makers haven't received any closure letter from the channel that proves that they are still in contract with them. The break has been decided mutually by the makers and channel as they want to reboot the show." But no announcement of it returning was made since then. Actor Dayanand Shetty who played Daya quoted that the show would not return after this break saying, "No, I don't think it's coming back. I doubt it's coming back. There can't be a break. It's just a convenient way of killing the show."

 Other initiatives 
On 7 July 2006, a nationwide talent hunt show called Operation Talaash was launched in search of a new officer to join the CID team. This concluded on 1 September 2006, with Vivek V. Mashru being chosen to play Sub-Inspector Vivek.

Sony Entertainment Television had launched CID: Gallantry Awards, an initiative to encourage and honour acts of bravery in society on 26 January 2010 Republic Day. The second edition of this initiative was aired on 23 January 2011. The third and fourth editions were aired on 1 April 2012 and 14 April 2013 respectively.

On 10 July 2015; Sony TV announced the Shaatir Lekhak Contest, in which 3 incomplete stories and clues were presented. Contestants were required to complete any one story out of three. The contest ended on 26 July 2015. The winning story appeared in episodes and prizes were also given to the winner. From the total entries, 3 winners were selected, one for each story. The result for the winners were declared during one of the episodes of CID prior to 1 September 2015.

 Crossovers CID had three crossover episodes with the series Aahat, once on 13 November 2009; second time on  12 February 2010 and third time on 25 June 2010.

It also had crossover episodes with Adaalat, once on 3–4 December 2010; second time on 15 July 2012 titled CID Viruddh Adaalat and third time on 20 December 2014 titled CID V/s Adaalat – Karmyudh.

It also had a crossover with Sab TV's comedy series Taarak Mehta Ka Ooltah Chashmah for 4 episodes. Titled as "Mahasangram", it started and ended in July 2014.

 Reception 
It entered in both Guinness Book of World records and Limca Book of Records for uncut shooting for 111 minutes for the episode named "The Inheritance" during October 2004.

 Critical response 
Rediff gave the series 4.5 / 5 stars, and stated, "Much of the credit for CID's success should go to Singh, and its cast, especially Shivaji Satam who plays ACP Pradyuman". It stated, "Its actors, or at least the core of the cast who have been a part of the series since its inception are so popular they have become household names." Rahul Hegde of Rediff giving the same ratings stated, "The crime detective series is still going strong".The Times of India stated, "CID which has constantly entertained its viewers with unique and challenging cases is also known for its different jokes in the world of internet."

 Accolades 

 Adaptations 
A Bengali adapted version of CID known as C.I.D. Kolkata Bureau'' aired on Sony Aath.

See also 
 List of programs broadcast by Sony Entertainment Television
 Midsomer Murders– A British series featuring UK CID

References

External links 

CID episodes On  Sony LIV

1998 Indian television series debuts
2000s Indian television series
Hindi-language television shows
Television shows set in Mumbai
Indian action television series
Indian crime television series
Detective television series
Sony Entertainment Television original programming
Sony Pictures Networks India franchises
Police procedural television series
Fictional portrayals of police departments in India
2018 Indian television series endings